Eresina schmitti, the Schmitt's eresina, is a butterfly in the family Lycaenidae. It is found in eastern Nigeria.

References

Endemic fauna of Nigeria
Butterflies described in 2005
Poritiinae